Galium muricatum, Humboldt bedstraw, is a species of plant in the Rubiaceae. It is native to northwestern California (Sonoma, Mendocino, Humboldt, Trinity and Siskiyou Counties) and southeastern Oregon (Curry, Josephine, Jackson, and Coos Counties).

Galium muricatum is a perennial herb with white flowers, spreading vegetatively to form sizable colonies. Leaves are in whorls of 4, elliptical, tapering at the tip.

References

External links
Gardening Europe
Discover Life, Humboldt bedstraw

muricatum
Flora of California
Flora of Oregon
Plants described in 1900